Jason Morgan Ritter (born February 17, 1980) is an American actor and producer. He is known for his roles as Kevin Girardi in the television series Joan of Arcadia, Ethan Haas in The Class, Sean Walker in the NBC series The Event, Dipper Pines in Gravity Falls, and Pat Rollins in Raising Dion. He also played the recurring role of Mark Cyr in the NBC television series Parenthood, for which he received an Emmy Award nomination. In 2017, Ritter starred in the ABC comedy series Kevin (Probably) Saves the World. He voiced the character Ryder in Frozen II.

Early life
Ritter was born on February 17, 1980, in Los Angeles, California, to actors Nancy Morgan and John Ritter. He is a grandson of actors Tex Ritter (who died six years before Ritter was born) and Dorothy Fay. His stepmother is actress Amy Yasbeck. Ritter has three siblings including actor Tyler Ritter.

Ritter first appeared in the opening credits of his father's show Three's Company with Joyce DeWitt in the petting-zoo scene.

He attended middle and high school at the Crossroads School in Santa Monica, California, with Simon Helberg, who became his roommate at NYU. He then attended and graduated from New York University's Tisch School of the Arts, where he studied at the Atlantic Theater Company. He also studied at the Royal Academy of Dramatic Art in London.

Career

Ritter appeared in The Dreamer of Oz: The L. Frank Baum Story, co-starring as Baum's son alongside his own father. In 2002, he appeared in the movies PG and Swimfan. In 2003, Ritter had a major role in the slasher/horror film Freddy vs. Jason as Will Rollins. He appeared in Raise Your Voice and Happy Endings. He portrayed Jeb Bush in the Oliver Stone film W. In 2007, he also voiced substitute teacher, Mr. Fisk, in an episode of All Grown Up!, the grown up version of Rugrats, a teacher whom Angelica falls in love with.

In 2008, he produced and starred in the film Good Dick with his long-term girlfriend at the time, Marianna Palka, who also wrote and directed the film.

Among Ritter's theater credits are Wendy Wasserstein's Third at Lincoln Center, for which he won the Clarence Derwent Award and the Martin E. Segal Award for his portrayal of the title character; the Off Broadway production of The Beginning of August, and the role of Tim in the world premiere of Neil LaBute's play The Distance From Here at London's Almeida Theatre. Ritter has volunteered as an actor with the Young Storytellers Program.

In 2012, Ritter starred in the Disney Channel series Gravity Falls, a show about twins Dipper and Mabel Pines who are sent to live with their "Grunkle" Stan, and decipher the weird events of Gravity Falls, Oregon. Ritter voiced Dipper in the show.

Ritter has appeared in the MTV show Punk'd. Ritter also starred as Sean Walker in the season-long NBC drama series The Event, which premiered on September 20, 2010. Ritter appeared alongside Kate French in the 2011 short film Atlantis, a romance film centered on two strangers who fall in love during the preparation for the final launch of the NASA Space Shuttle Atlantis. He had a recurring role on NBC's Parenthood. His performance on the show earned him an Emmy Award nomination in 2012.

In March 2013 it was announced that Ritter would play Gavin opposite Alexis Bledel's Stacey in Us & Them, Fox's sitcom pilot based on the British television show Gavin & Stacey. It was eventually picked up as a series, but it was canceled by Fox before the show could premiere. In September 2018, Sony Crackle picked up the series' seven episodes for streaming starting October 1.

In October 2017, it was announced that Ritter would play Pat Rollins in the Netflix superhero series Raising Dion. The first season was released on October 4, 2019.

Ritter has also been featured in the period sitcom Another Period as Lord Frederick Bellacourt. His character is the illiterate twin brother of Beatrice, with whom he is involved in an incestuous relationship.

In 2018, Ritter had a supporting role in The Tale, an autobiographical feature film written and directed by Jennifer Fox. The film premiered at the 2018 Sundance Film Festival on January 20, 2018, and later on HBO on May 26, 2018.

In September 2019, it was revealed that Ritter would voice Ryder, a member of Northuldra tribe, in Frozen II.

Personal life
From October 1999 to 2013, Ritter was in a relationship with Marianna Palka. They met while they were both studying at the Atlantic Theater Company in New York City. In 2017, Ritter became engaged to actress Melanie Lynskey after four years of dating. The couple had their first child, a daughter, in December 2018. They wed in 2020.

Filmography

Film

Television

Web

Awards and nominations

References

External links

Biography for Ritter, Jason

1980 births
Living people
20th-century American male actors
21st-century American male actors
Male actors from Los Angeles
American male child actors
American male film actors
American male voice actors
American male television actors
Clarence Derwent Award winners
Tisch School of the Arts alumni
Crossroads School alumni